Michigan Technological University's Winter Carnival is an annual celebration that takes place every winter hosted by Michigan Technological University in Houghton, Michigan. It is a time to celebrate the large amounts of snowfall Michigan's Keweenaw Peninsula receives each winter. Winter Carnival is characterized by snow statues, outdoor games, and many student activities. February 2022 marked the 100th anniversary of Winter Carnival. In 1958, Blue Key began the tradition of selecting a yearly theme for the events, including motion pictures, historical events, comics, music and more. Snow statue designs are inspired by the theme. Eventually, a logo contest was incorporated with cash prizes.

References 

Carnival in the United States
Winter festivals in the United States
Festivals in Michigan
Recurring events established in 1922
Outdoor sculptures in Michigan
Buildings and structures made of snow or ice
Tourist attractions in Houghton County, Michigan
Michigan Technological University
Michigan Technological University Winter Carnival
Michigan-related lists